The 1965 Ohio State Buckeyes baseball team represented the Ohio State University in the 1965 NCAA University Division baseball season. The team was coached by Marty Karow in his 15th season at Ohio State.

The Buckeyes lost the College World Series, defeated by the Arizona State Sun Devils in the championship game.

Roster

Schedule and results

! style="" | Regular Season (23–11)
|- valign="top"

|- align="center" bgcolor="#ccffcc"
| || at  || Unknown • Flagstaff, Arizona || 5–1 || 1–0 || –
|- align="center" bgcolor="#ccffcc"
| || at Arizona State College || Unknown • Flagstaff, Arizona || 12–7 || 2–0 || –
|- align="center" bgcolor="#ccffcc"
| || at  || Brazell Field • Phoenix, Arizona || 6–2 || 3–0 || –
|- align="center" bgcolor="#ffcccc"
| || at Arizona State || Phoenix Municipal Stadium • Phoenix, Arizona || 3–6 || 3–1 || –
|- align="center" bgcolor="#ffcccc"
| || at Arizona State || Phoenix Municipal Stadium • Phoenix, Arizona || 6–7 || 3–2 || –
|- align="center" bgcolor="#ffcccc"
| || at Arizona State || Phoenix Municipal Stadium • Phoenix, Arizona || 3–10 || 3–3 || –
|- align="center" bgcolor="#ccffcc"
| || at Grand Canyon || Brazell Field • Phoenix, Arizona || 5–1 || 4–3 || –
|- align="center" bgcolor="#ffcccc"
| || at  || UA Field • Tucson, Arizona || 1–11 || 4–4 || –
|- align="center" bgcolor="#ffcccc"
| || at Arizona || UA Field • Tucson, Arizona || 3–8 || 4–5 || –
|- align="center" bgcolor="#ccffcc"
| || at Arizona || UA Field • Tucson, Arizona || 4–1 || 5–5 || –
|- align="center" bgcolor="#ffcccc"
| || at Arizona || UA Field • Tucson, Arizona || 0–3 || 5–6 || –
|-

|- align="center" bgcolor="#ccffcc"
| || at  || Simmons Field • Columbia, Missouri || 10–6 || 6–6 || –
|- align="center" bgcolor="#ccffcc"
| ||  || Unknown • Columbus, Ohio || 8–5 || 7–6 || –
|- align="center" bgcolor="#ccffcc"
| || Cincinnati || Unknown • Columbus, Ohio || 4–1 || 8–6 || –
|- align="center" bgcolor="#ffcccc"
| || Cincinnati || Unknown • Columbus, Ohio || 2–3 || 8–7 || –
|- align="center" bgcolor="#ccffcc"
| ||  || Unknown • Columbus, Ohio || 9–0 || 9–7 || –
|- align="center" bgcolor="#ccffcc"
| ||  || Unknown • Columbus, Ohio || 6–0 || 10–7 || –
|- align="center" bgcolor="#ffcccc"
| || Ball State || Unknown • Columbus, Ohio || 5–6 || 10–8 || –
|- align="center" bgcolor="#ccffcc"
| || Ball State || Unknown • Columbus, Ohio || 9–1 || 11–8 || –
|- align="center" bgcolor="#ffcccc"
| || at  || Hyames Field • Kalamazoo, Michigan || 1–7 || 11–9 || –
|- align="center" bgcolor="#ccffcc"
| || at Western Michigan || Hyames Field • Kalamazoo, Michigan || 4–1 || 12–9 || –
|- align="center" bgcolor="#ccffcc"
| || at  || Sembower Field • Bloomington, Indiana || 8–2 || 13–9 || 1–0
|- align="center" bgcolor="#ccffcc"
| || at Indiana || Sembower Field • Bloomington, Indiana || 6–5 || 14–9 || 2–0
|- align="center" bgcolor="#ffcccc"
| || at Indiana || Sembower Field • Bloomington, Indiana || 0–1 || 14–10 || 2–1
|- align="center" bgcolor="#ccffcc"
| || at  || Rocky Miller Park • Evanston, Illinois || 10–2 || 15–10 || 3–1
|-

|- align="center" bgcolor="#ccffcc"
| || at  || Guy Lowman Field • Madison, Wisconsin || 6–2 || 16–10 || 4–1
|- align="center" bgcolor="#ccffcc"
| || at Wisconsin || Guy Lowman Field • Madison, Wisconsin || 3–4 || 17–10 || 5–1
|- align="center" bgcolor="#ccffcc"
| ||  || Unknown • Columbus, Ohio || 6–5 || 18–10 || 6–1
|- align="center" bgcolor="#ccffcc"
| ||  || Unknown • Columbus, Ohio || 7–5 || 19–10 || 7–1
|- align="center" bgcolor="#ffcccc"
| || Illinois || Unknown • Columbus, Ohio || 0–2 || 19–11 || 7–2
|- align="center" bgcolor="#ccffcc"
| || at  || Unknown • Iowa City, Iowa || 3–0 || 20–11 || 8–2
|- align="center" bgcolor="#ccffcc"
| ||  || Unknown • Columbus, Ohio || 4–3 || 21–11 || 9–2
|- align="center" bgcolor="#ccffcc"
| ||  || Unknown • Columbus, Ohio || 13–10 || 22–11 || 10–2
|- align="center" bgcolor="#ccffcc"
| || Michigan State || Unknown • Columbus, Ohio || 2–0 || 23–11 || 11–2
|- align="center" bgcolor="white"

|-
! style="" | Postseason (7–2)
|-

|- align="center" bgcolor="#ccffcc"
| || vs Ball State || Trautwein Field • Athens, Ohio || 4–0 || 24–11 || 11–2
|- align="center" bgcolor="#ccffcc"
| || at  || Trautwein Field • Athens, Ohio || 4–2 || 25–11 || 11–2
|- align="center" bgcolor="#ccffcc"
| || vs  || Trautwein Field • Athens, Ohio || 10–7 || 26–11 || 11–2
|-

|- align="center" bgcolor="#ccffcc"
| || vs Florida State || Johnny Rosenblatt Stadium • Omaha, Nebraska || 2–1 || 27–11 || 11–2
|- align="center" bgcolor="#ccffcc"
| || vs Washington State || Johnny Rosenblatt Stadium • Omaha, Nebraska || 14–1 || 28–11 || 11–2
|- align="center" bgcolor="#ffcccc"
| || vs Arizona State || Johnny Rosenblatt Stadium • Omaha, Nebraska || 4–9 || 28–12 || 11–2
|- align="center" bgcolor="#ccffcc"
| || vs Washington State || Johnny Rosenblatt Stadium • Omaha, Nebraska || 1–0 || 29–12 || 11–2
|- align="center" bgcolor="#ccffcc"
| || vs Arizona State || Johnny Rosenblatt Stadium • Omaha, Nebraska || 7–3 || 30–12 || 11–2
|- align="center" bgcolor="#ffcccc"
| || vs Arizona State || Johnny Rosenblatt Stadium • Omaha, Nebraska || 1–2 || 30–13 || 11–2
|- align="center" bgcolor="white"

| Schedule Source:

Awards and honors 
Arnold Chonko
All Tournament Team
First Team All-Big Ten

Bo Rein
All Tournament Team

Chuck Brinkman
All Tournament Team

Steve Arlin
All Tournament Team
First Team All-American

Buckeyes in the 1965 MLB Draft
The following members of the Ohio State Buckeyes baseball program were drafted in the 1965 Major League Baseball Draft.

References

Ohio State
Ohio State Buckeyes baseball seasons
Ohio State Buckeyes baseball
College World Series seasons
Big Ten Conference baseball champion seasons